Heartstrings (lit. You've Fallen for Me) is a 2011 South Korean television series starring Park Shin-hye and Jung Yong-hwa. It aired on MBC from June 29 to August 19, 2011, on Wednesdays and Thursdays at 21:55 (KST) for 15 episodes.

Heartstrings is a youth melodrama about love, friendship and dreams, set against the backdrop of a performing arts college. The drama reunited Jung Yong-hwa and Park Shin-hye who both starred in the TV series You're Beautiful (2009).

Synopsis
A series of misunderstandings causes Lee Shin (Jung Yong-hwa), the cocky leader of "The Stupid" and Lee Gyu-won (Park Shin-hye), a college student majoring in Traditional Korean Music to start on the wrong foot. Gyu-won does not understand why Lee Shin is so popular, until one day she is forced to go the band's concert with her friends, who are fans of "The Stupid". There, she sees Lee Shin performing live, and is immediately captivated by him.

When Gyu-won decides to join the performance group for the upcoming 100th anniversary performance for the university, everyone sees her potential and talent, particularly Kim Suk-hyun (Song Chang-eui), a Broadway composer-turned-music director. She competes with Han Hee-joo (Kim Yoon-hye), the spoiled daughter of the Chairman, for the role of the leading actress (but lost to her, as Hee-joo had previously bribed the judges). Lee Shin also decides to join the musical due to his crush on the dance professor, Jung Yoon-soo (So Yi-hyun), who is also the choreographer and muse of the musical. As Gyu-won and Lee Shin spend more time together, they began to fall for each other.

Fearing that Gyu-won might outshine her daughter, Hee-joo's mother schemes with Im Tae-joon (Lee Jung-heon), one of the school's administrators; and they plot to destroy Gyu-won's image to force her to quit the performance. Lee Shin works with Suk-hyun in order to clear Gyu-won's name. Meanwhile, Joon-hee (Kang Min-hyuk) struggles between his ever-growing feelings for Hee-joo and helping his friends as she threatens their university lives.

When Hee-joo is found to be suffering from vocal chord infection, Gyu-won is given the chance to replace her and go on stage. However, the kind-hearted Gyu-won chooses to let Hee-joo stand on stage instead, while she sings for her backstage. When the media found out that Gyu-won was the actual singer, she was offered a chance to go overseas to record an album. A new conflict occurs as Gyu-won is made to choose between her dreams and love. At the same time, Lee Shin was suffering from a broken wrist caused by a fall he suffered with Gyu-won earlier. Worried that she might forfeit her dream to stay with him, he lies to her and insists that he is fine, even after crouching in pain during a performance with The Stupid. Gyu-won eventually decides to go to the United Kingdom to fulfill her dream, while Lee Shin undergoes surgery to fix his broken wrist.

Cast

Main
 Park Shin-hye as Lee Gyu-won
A student majoring in Traditional Korean Music, born to a prestigious musical family. She later discovers her passion for musicals and fights to realize her dreams.

Jung Yong-hwa as Lee Shin
Lead singer and guitarist of "The Stupid", known for his good looks and musical talent. Perceived as cold and distant, Lee Shin harbors a soft side within him. He initially has a crush on Yoon-soo, but later falls for Gyu-won.

 Song Chang-eui as Kim Suk-hyun 
A famous director who earned accolades for successfully producing original musicals on Broadway. He acts as a mentor to the aspiring students.

 So Yi-hyun as Jung Yoon-soo
A professional ballerina as well as dance choreographer. She was in a relationship with Suk-hyun, but broke up with him to further her studies at New York.

Supporting

Students
 Kang Min-hyuk as Yeo Joon-hee 
Drummer of "The Stupid". A sexy but innocent man who is always hungry. He falls in love with Hee-joo at first sight, and calls her "Natasha".
 Kim Yoon-hye as Han Hee-joo
The Chairman's daughter. An arrogant and spoiled woman, who has a crush on Lee Shin. She sees Gyu-won as her rival, and attempts to sabotage her multiple times. 
 Lee Hyun-jin as Hyun Ki-young 
A talented singer who suffers from stage fright, but later overcomes it with encouragement from Suk-hyun.
 Im Se-mi as Cha Bo-woon 
Gyu-won's close friend, and fellow member of "The Windflowers".
Jang Seo-won as Lee Soo-myung
Lim Do-yoon as Sa-rang
Oh Won-bin as guitarist of "The Stupid"
Song Se-hyun as bassist of "The Stupid"

Family members
 Shin Goo as Lee Dong-jin 
Gyu-won's grandfather. A strict and traditional man. He is a famous pansori master, and one of the top 3 traditional musicians of his age. His biggest wish is to see his granddaughter become a traditional music prodigy. 
 Seo Beom-seok as Lee Hyun-soo 
Lee Shin's father. A famous guitarist who later dies from alcohol poisoning. He was Sun-ki's best friend, and stole Ji-young away from him. 
 Lee Il-hwa as Song Ji-young
Lee Shin's mother. She was a band singer and first love of Lee Sun-ki, but their relationship was opposed by Lee Dong-jin. 
Sunwoo Jae-duk as Lee Sun-ki 
Gyu-won's father, who was banished from the family by Lee Dong-jin due to his love of classical piano.
 Moon Ga-young as Lee Jung-hyun 
Younger sister of Lee Shin. A spoiled brat who often extorts money from Lee Shin and Gyu-won. She is later shown to develop an interest for pansori, which delights Lee Dong-jin.

Others
 Lee Jung-heon as Im Tae-joon 
Department Head. He has a crush on Yoon-soo, and favors Hee-joo due to her being the Chairman's daughter. 
 Jung Kyung-ho as Goo Jung-eun 
The owner of Catharsis, also known as Madam Gu. 
 Kim Sun-kyung as Professor Hong
 Gi Ju-bong as University Chairman

Title
The series initially had the working title Festival, until broadcaster MBC announced an online contest held from March 30 to April 10, 2011 to give it a new title. Among over 4,000 suggestions submitted to the MBC website, You've Fallen for Me was chosen as the Korean title. A second online contest for the international English title was held on the digital American distribution platform DramaFever, and Heartstrings won the fan poll.

Soundtrack
The Heartstrings soundtrack was released in four installments every week starting from June 29, 2011, and concluding on July 20, 2011.

Ratings

Awards and nominations

Notes

References

External links
  
 
 

2011 South Korean television series debuts
2011 South Korean television series endings
MBC TV television dramas
Korean-language television shows
2010s college television series
South Korean musical television series
South Korean romance television series
South Korean teen dramas
Television series by JS Pictures
South Korean college television series